Chiriguelo is a place or inhabited location in the Paraguayan district of Pedro Juan Caballero.

Chiriguelo is near the border with Brazil, and has police and customs offices to control or check migration and merchandise traffic between Paraguay and Brazil; these services were previously provided by the offices in Pedro Juan Caballero.

Populated places in the Amambay Department